Jackson Mendy (born 25 May 1987) is a professional footballer who plays as a defender. Born in France, he represented the Senegal national team internationally.

Club career
Mendy was born in Mont-Saint-Aignan, France. He started his career in the training centre of Auxerre, moving first to Quevilly, before signing a one-season professional trainee contract with Rennes in June 2006. A year later, having not imposed himself, he left Rennes for Paris FC.

After one season at Paris FC, Mendy moved to Germany, first with Hansa Rostock, where he played for the B team, and then with SC Freiburg. He left the club in July 2010, having a trial at English Championship team Middlesbrough before signing a two-year deal with French side Grenoble Foot 38. He stayed just one season, due to Grenoble filing for bankruptcy at the end of the 2010–11 Ligue 2 campaign. On 31 July 2011, he signed a one-year contract with Ligue 1 side AC Ajaccio.

Mendy made his Ligue 1 debut on 17 September 2011, as a second half substitute in the match at Nice. After making just three Ligue 1 appearances, he moved to Superleague Greece side Levadiakos in January 2012, signing a two-year deal. He was released from his contract at the end of the 2012–13 season, and joined Bulgarian side CSKA Sofia. He spent a second season in Bulgaria with Litex Lovech in 2014–15 before a six-month spell in Cyprus with Omonia.

In January 2016 Mendy returned to Levadiakos for a second spell, spending two-and-a-half seasons with the club. In July 2018 he signed a two-year deal with Swiss side FC Schaffhausen. Having been used most often as a substitute in the second half of the 2018–19 season, he signed for US Boulogne.

International career
On 11 May 2010, he earned his first call-up for the Senegal national football team for a friendly match against Denmark on 27 May 2010.

References

External links
 
 

1987 births
Living people
People from Mont-Saint-Aignan
French sportspeople of Senegalese descent
Citizens of Senegal through descent
Sportspeople from Seine-Maritime
French footballers
Senegalese footballers
Association football defenders
Senegal international footballers
FC Hansa Rostock players
SC Freiburg players
Paris FC players
Stade Rennais F.C. players
AJ Auxerre players
Grenoble Foot 38 players
AC Ajaccio players
US Quevilly-Rouen Métropole players
Levadiakos F.C. players
PFC CSKA Sofia players
PFC Litex Lovech players
AC Omonia players
FC Schaffhausen players
US Boulogne players
Ligue 1 players
Ligue 2 players
Championnat National players
Bundesliga players
First Professional Football League (Bulgaria) players
Super League Greece players
Cypriot First Division players
Swiss Challenge League players
Senegalese expatriate footballers
Senegalese expatriate sportspeople in Germany
French expatriate sportspeople in Germany
Expatriate footballers in Germany
Senegalese expatriate sportspeople in Bulgaria
Expatriate footballers in Bulgaria
Senegalese expatriate sportspeople in Greece
Expatriate footballers in Greece
Senegalese expatriate sportspeople in Cyprus
Expatriate footballers in Cyprus
Senegalese expatriate sportspeople in Switzerland
Expatriate footballers in Switzerland
Footballers from Normandy